Jan Kok (13 June 1899, Amsterdam - 7 September 1982, Egmond aan Zee) was a Dutch pharmacist. In 1945, he was appointed as professor at the University of Amsterdam, and between 1960 and 1964 he was rector magnificus of this university.

External links
 Biography (in Dutch)
 Prof. dr. J. Kok, 1899 - 1982 at the University of Amsterdam Album Academicum website

1899 births
1982 deaths
Dutch pharmacists
Scientists from Amsterdam
University of Amsterdam alumni
Academic staff of the University of Amsterdam